ORHS may refer to:
 Oak Ridge High School (disambiguation)
 Otay Ranch High School, Chula Vista, California, United States
 Oxford Regional High School, Oxford, Nova Scotia, Canada
 Oyster River High School, Durham, New Hampshire, United States